José López Portillo y Weber (19 April 1889 – 17 January 1974) was a Mexican engineer, historian, investigator and academic. He specialized in the history of Nueva Galicia and Jalisco. He was the son of politician José López Portillo y Rojas and father of president José López Portillo.

Published works 

 Historia del petróleo en México
 La conquista de Nueva Galicia, in 1935.
 La génesis de los signos de las letras, in 1935.
 La rebelión de Nueva Galicia, in 1939.
 Guadalajara de fin de siglo, in 1950.
 Dinámica histórica de México, in 1953.
 Cristóbal de Oñate: historia novela, in 1955.
 Jalisco y el golpe de estado de Comonfort, in 1958.
 Guadalajara, el Hospicio Cabañas y su fundador, in 1971.

External links 
 

Writers from Jalisco
1889 births
1974 deaths